The Bynum Mound and Village Site (22CS501) is a Middle Woodland period archaeological site located near Houston in Chickasaw County, Mississippi. The complex of six burial mounds was in use during the Miller 1 and Miller 2 phases of the Miller culture and was built between 100 BC and 100 AD. It was listed on the National Register of Historic Places in 1989 as part of the Natchez Trace Parkway at milepost 232.4.

Site description
The  site is located on a low ridge which overlooks Houlka Creek in the Tombigbee River drainage area. In the 1940s, archaeologists with the National Park Service excavated five of the mounds. The two largest mounds were restored afterward and the site is open to the public and now includes informational plaques. Excavations produced artifacts made from non local materials such as Greenstone, copper, and galena, and distinctive projectile points that did not originate at the site or even in Mississippi. Similar high prestige exotic goods were also found at Pharr Mounds, a nearby contemporaneous site, which show the local peoples involvement with the Hopewell exchange system, long distance trade network and religious network.

Mound A
During excavations of Mound A archaeologists found the remains of a woman who had been placed between two parallel burned oak logs buried at the base of the mound. They also found ornamental copper spools at each of her wrists. They also found the remains of two adult males and a child.

Mound B
The largest mound at the site, Mound B, was found to be covering a log lined crematory pit. Archaeologists found twenty nine polished greenstone celts arranged in an L-shaped pattern. They also found human remains, some cremated and others unburned, on the ash-covered floor of the pit. Exotic artifacts including copper ear-spools, nineteen chert projectile points believed to have been imported from Hopewell peoples in Illinois, and a piece of galena were also found.

References

External links

 Bynum Mounds Mississippi Orbs
 Bynum Mounds on Flickr
 Archaeology of prehistoric native America: an encyclopedia

Miller culture
Protected areas of Chickasaw County, Mississippi
Archaeological sites on the National Register of Historic Places in Mississippi
1st-century BC establishments
1st-century disestablishments
National Register of Historic Places in Chickasaw County, Mississippi
Mounds in Mississippi